The Aboriginal Shire of Napranum is a local government area in Far North Queensland, Australia. It is on the western side of the Cape York Peninsula around Weipa.

Geography 
Most local government areas are a single contiguous area (possibly including islands). However, Aboriginal Shires are often defined as a number of disjoint areas each containing an Indigenous community. In the case of the Aboriginal Shire of Napranum, it consists of several disjoint parts of the locality of Mission River (remainder in Shire of Cook) with the town of Napranum as its seat.

Amenities 
Napranum Shire Council operate an Indigenous Knowledge Centre at Napranum.

Mayors 

 2020–present: Janita Motton

References

 
Napranum